The Peugeot Type 26 was produced from 1899 to 1902 by Peugeot. It was larger than the mainstream Peugeot range, available  as a four-seater. However, the Type 26 still used the traditional rear-engined layout and chain drive mechanism of Peugeot's earliest cars. By the time it went out of production in 1902, this layout had been rendered obsolete by the introduction of rotating steel drive shaft and front-engine configuration of the Peugeot Type 48. A total of 419 Type 26s were produced.

References
Peugeot Car Models from 1889 to 2020
Histomobile page on Peugeot Type 26
All you ever wanted to know about Peugeot

1900s cars
Type 26
Rear-engined vehicles
Cars introduced in 1899